Betsy Mitchell (born January 15, 1966) is an American competition swimmer who was a world record-holder, world champion, and Olympic gold and silver medalist.  She also was a member of the United States' 1994 Rowing World Championship team.

Mitchell began competitive swimming at age 5 as a member of the Marietta (Ohio) YMCA Marlins swim team age group coaches in Marietta included Coach Jim Everett and  Coach Bill BAuer. Later she competed for Mercersburg Academy in Mercersburg, Pennsylvania during her high school years, graduating in 1983. Following high school, she attended the University of North Carolina at Chapel Hill and competed for the North Carolina Tar Heels swimming and diving team during her first year, the 1983–84 NCAA season.

Mitchell represented the United States at two consecutive Olympic Games.  At the 1984 Summer Olympics in Los Angeles, she won a silver medal for her second-place performance in the women's 100-meter backstroke, finishing with a time of 1:02.63.  She also earned a gold medal by swimming the backstroke leg for the winning U.S. team in the preliminary heats of the women's 4×100-meter medley relay.

After the 1984 Olympics, Mitchell transferred to the University of Texas at Austin, and swam for the Texas Longhorns swimming and diving team from 1985 to 1988.  She won nine NCAA titles, and was a member of the Longhorns NCAA national championship teams in 1986, 1987 and 1988.  Mitchell received the Honda Sports Award for Swimming and Diving 1987–88, and was inducted into the Texas Longhorns Hall of Honor in 2000.

She set an American and world record in the 200-meter backstroke at the 1986 World Championship Trials (2:08.60).  The world record stood for five years. The American record stood for 19 years.  Swimming World Magazine named her as its American Female Swimmer of the Year in 1986.

She again competed at the 1988 Summer Olympics in Seoul, South Korea.  She received a silver medal for swimming the backstroke leg for the second-place U.S. team in the women's 4×100-meter medley relay in the preliminary heats.  Individually, she also swam in the final of the women's 100-meter backstroke, finishing fourth in the final with a time of 1:02.71.

She was inducted into the International Swimming Hall of Fame as an "Honor Swimmer" in 1998.

Mitchell has a bachelor's and master's degree in education, specializing in sports administration, from the University of Texas at Austin.  She also completed a one-year program at the Harvard Graduate School of Education, earning a certificate in educational administration, planning and policy.

She started her career as the women's swimming coach at Dartmouth College from 1990 to 1996. She then served from 1997 to 2003 as the director of athletics at Laurel School for Girls in Shaker Heights, Ohio.  Mitchell was then the director of athletics and recreation at Allegheny College in Meadville, Pennsylvania from 2005 to 2011. She is currently the director of athletics, physical education, and recreation at the California Institute of Technology in Pasadena, California.

See also
 List of members of the International Swimming Hall of Fame
 List of Olympic medalists in swimming (women)
 List of University of Texas at Austin alumni
 List of World Aquatics Championships medalists in swimming (women)
 World record progression 200 metres backstroke

References

External links
 
 

 

1966 births
Living people
American female backstroke swimmers
American female freestyle swimmers
World record setters in swimming
North Carolina Tar Heels women's swimmers
Olympic silver medalists for the United States in swimming
Swimmers from Cincinnati
Swimmers at the 1984 Summer Olympics
Swimmers at the 1988 Summer Olympics
Texas Longhorns women's swimmers
World Aquatics Championships medalists in swimming
Medalists at the 1988 Summer Olympics
Medalists at the 1984 Summer Olympics
Olympic gold medalists for the United States in swimming
Harvard Graduate School of Education alumni
Dartmouth Big Green swimming coaches